The Alungul language, Ogh Alungul (Alngula), is an extinct Paman language of the Cape York Peninsula in Queensland, Australia.

References

Thaypan languages
Extinct languages of Queensland